Brad Camp (born 25 December 1964) is an Australian former long-distance runner who competed in the 1988 Summer Olympics.

References

1964 births
Living people
Australian male long jumpers
Olympic athletes of Australia
Athletes (track and field) at the 1988 Summer Olympics
20th-century Australian people